Stanton Lacy is a civil parish in Shropshire, England.  It contains 22 listed buildings that are recorded in the National Heritage List for England.  Of these, one is listed at Grade I, the highest of the three grades, one is at Grade II*, the middle grade, and the others are at Grade II, the lowest grade.  The parish contains the village of Stanton Lacy and smaller settlements, and is otherwise rural.  Most of the listed buildings are houses, farmhouses and farm buildings, many of which are timber framed, or have a timber-framed core.  The other listed buildings consist of a church, a sundial in the churchyard, a country house and associated buildings, a milestone, a war memorial, and a telephone kiosk.


Key

Buildings

References

Citations

Sources

Lists of buildings and structures in Shropshire